Thuraakunu (Dhivehi: ތުރާކުނު) is the northernmost island in Maldives, one of the fourteen inhabited islands of Haa Alif Atoll and is geographically part of the Ihavandhippolhu Atoll in the Maldives. It is an island-level administrative constituency governed by the Thuraakunu Island Council.

History
Thuraakunu is the closest island to Minicoy. Formerly there was direct trade between both, and fishermen from both islands used to visit each other. This exchange continued even after Minicoy became part of the Indian Union after independence.  However, after 1956 the Indian government forbade these visits. Now, despite the geographical proximity and ethnographic similarities, people from both islands are not allowed to meet each other.

Geography

Demography

See also

List of lighthouses in the Maldives

References

 Bell, H.C.P.: The Maldive Islands, An account of the physical features, History, Inhabitants, Productions and Trade. Colombo 1883.
 Xavier Romero-Frias, The Maldive Islanders, A Study of the Popular Culture of an Ancient Ocean Kingdom. Barcelona 1999,

External links
Isles: Thuraakunu

Islands of the Maldives
Lighthouses in the Maldives